Euempheremyia is a genus of parasitic flies in the family Tachinidae. There are at least four described species in Euempheremyia.

Species
These four species belong to the genus Euempheremyia:
 Euempheremyia albuquerquei Guimaraes, 1963
 Euempheremyia elyowaldi Guimaraes, 1963
 Euempheremyia melotris Reinhard, 1975
 Euempheremyia paulensis Townsend, 1927

References

Further reading

 
 
 
 

Tachinidae
Articles created by Qbugbot